Armine Khachatryan (born 16 September 1986) is an Armenian professional women's football defender. She played in the Turkish Women's First League for Hakkarigücü Spor with jersey number 4. She capped 18 times for the Armenia women's national football team.

Career

Club
She moved to Turkey and joined the newly promoted club Hakkarigücü Spor on 14 February 2019 to play in the second half of the 2018-19 Turkish Women's First Football League season.

She returned home end September 2019.

International
Between 2009 and 2010, she played for the Armenia women's national team in seven matches of the  2011 Women's World Cup Qualifying. In 2011 and 2012, she took part in all three UEFA Women's Euro 2013 qualifying Group 2, and in all eight UEFA Women's Euro 2013 qualifying – Group 7 matches.

International goals

See also
List of Armenia women's international footballers

References

External links
 Football Federation of Armenia

Living people
1986 births
Armenian women's footballers
Women's association football defenders
Hakkarigücü Spor players
Armenia women's international footballers
Armenian expatriate footballers
Armenian expatriate sportspeople in Turkey
Expatriate women's footballers in Turkey
Armenian expatriate sportspeople in Kazakhstan
Expatriate women's footballers in Kazakhstan